In control theory, a controlled invariant subspace of the state space representation of some system is a subspace such that, if the state of the system is initially in the subspace, it is possible to control the system so that the state is in the subspace at all times. This concept was introduced by Giuseppe Basile and Giovanni Marro .

Definition 
Consider a linear system described by the differential equation

Here, x(t) ∈ Rn denotes the state of the system and u(t) ∈ Rp is the input. The matrices A and B have size n × n and n × p respectively.

A subspace V ⊂ Rn is a controlled invariant subspace if for any x(0) ∈ V, there is an input u(t) such that x(t) ∈ V for all nonnegative t.

Properties 
A subspace V ⊂ Rn is a controlled invariant subspace if and only if AV ⊂ V + Im B. If V is a controlled invariant subspace, then there exists a matrix K such that the input u(t) = Kx(t) keeps the state within V; this is a simple feedback control .

References
 .
 .
 .

Invariant subspaces
Operator theory
Linear algebra
Control theory